Heterohelix is an extinct genus of foraminifera belonging to the family Heterohelicidae of the superfamily Heterohelicoidea and the suborder Globigerinina. Its type species is Heterohelix americana (formerly Textilaria americana).

Species
Species in Heterohelix include:

 Heterohelix americana
 Heterohelix budugensis
 Heterohelix buliminiformis
 Heterohelix bulloides
 Heterohelix calabarflanki
 Heterohelix carinata
 Heterohelix concinna
 Heterohelix cornuta
 Heterohelix digitata
 Heterohelix elongata
 Heterohelix gradata
 Heterohelix hohenemsensis
 Heterohelix ilkhidagensis
 Heterohelix irregularis
 Heterohelix labellosa
 Heterohelix oculis
 Heterohelix perquadrata
 Heterohelix praeelongata
 Heterohelix praegradata
 Heterohelix praeirregularis
 Heterohelix pseudocarseyae
 Heterohelix pseudoreussi
 Heterohelix robusta
 Heterohelix sphenoides
 Heterohelix stenopos
 Heterohelix suwalkensis
 Heterohelix trochospiralis
 Heterohelix varsoviensis
 Heterohelix vistulaensis
subgenus Heterohelix (Heterohelix)
 Heterohelix (Heterohelix) planeobtusa

References

Foraminifera genera
Globigerinina